Carlone is a surname. Notable people with the surname include:

Alessio Carlone (born 1996), Belgian football player
Andrea Carlone (1626–1697), Italian painter
Carlo Carlone (1686–1775), Italian painter and engraver
Diego Francesco Carlone (1674–1750), Italian sculptor
Francis Nunzio Carlone or Frankie Carle (1903–2001), American pianist and bandleader
Giovanni Battista Carlone (1603–1684), Italian painter
Giovanni Bernardo Carlone (1590–1630), Italian painter
Pietro Francesco Carlone (before 1607–1681/82), Austrian architect
Taddeo Carlone (died 1613), Swiss-Italian sculptor and architect
Carlo Martino Carlone (1616-1667), Italian architect

See also

Carlon

References

Patronymic surnames